Shahgarh is a village and community development block headquarters in Gauriganj tehsil of Amethi district, Uttar Pradesh, India. As of 2011, it has a population of 3,201 people, in 525 households. It historically was the seat of a taluqdari estate held by a branch of the Bandhalgoti Rajputs. Today it serves as the seat of a nyaya panchayat which also includes 13 other villages.

History
The original fort of Shahgarh was founded by and named after Sultan Sah, brother of Bikram Sah of Amethi. His descendants held the Shahgarh taluqdari estate. Originally the estate supposedly consisted of 121 villages, suggesting a regular partition, but this is unlikely since another brother, Lachhmi Narain, received the much smaller Kannu estate. From 1803 to 1810, the Shahgarh estate was leased to Raja Har Chand Singh of Amethi along with the entire pargana of Amethi; it then comprised 40 villages. It had increased to 60 villages by 1846, when it was again leased to Amethi. When Balwant Singh, the taluqdar of Shahgarh, resisted the lease, Raja Madho Singh of Amethi had him imprisoned. The British officer William Henry Sleeman brought the issue before the Nawab of Awadh and in 1855 was able to secure Balwant Singh's release and restoration to his property; Balwant Singh later sided with the British during the Indian Rebellion of 1857. At the turn of the 20th century, the Shahgarh estate consisted of 20 villages and 1 patti in pargana Amethi. At that time, Shahgarh itself was described as a prosperous village with a market.

The 1951 census recorded Shahgarh as comprising 13 hamlets, with a total population of 1,112 people (549 male and 563 female), in 254 households and 252 physical houses. The area of the village was given as 701 acres. 160 residents were literate, 158 male and 2 female. The village was listed as belonging to the pargana of Amethi and the thana of Gauriganj. The village had a district board-run primary school with 80 students in attendance as of 1 January 1951.

The 1961 census recorded Shahgarh as comprising 13 hamlets, with a total population of 1,239 people (618 male and 621 female), in 279 households and 267 physical houses. The area of the village was given as 701 acres and it had a post office at that point. It was then part of Bhitua CD block.

The 1981 census recorded Shahgarh as having a population of 1,722 people, in 355 households, and having an area of 274.39 hectares. The main staple foods were listed as wheat and rice.

The 1991 census recorded Shahgarh as having a total population of 2,152 people (1,130 male and 1,022 female), in 396 households and 382 physical houses. The area of the village was listed as 276.00 hectares. Members of the 0-6 age group numbered 388, or 18% of the total; this group was 52% male (201) and 48% female (187). Members of scheduled castes numbered 402, or 19% of the village's total population, while no members of scheduled tribes were recorded. The literacy rate of the village was 35% (474 men and 143 women, counting only people age 7 and up). 724 people were classified as main workers (573 men and 151 women), while 0 people were classified as marginal workers; the remaining 1,428 residents were non-workers. The breakdown of main workers by employment category was as follows: 371 cultivators (i.e. people who owned or leased their own land); 245 agricultural labourers (i.e. people who worked someone else's land in return for payment); 1 worker in livestock, forestry, fishing, hunting, plantations, orchards, etc.; 0 in mining and quarrying; 0 household industry workers; 1 worker employed in other manufacturing, processing, service, and repair roles; 0 construction workers; 4 employed in trade and commerce; 1 employed in transport, storage, and communications; and 101 in other services.

Villages
Shahgarh CD block has the following 66 villages:

References

Villages in Amethi district
Community development blocks in India
Former zamindari estates in Uttar Pradesh